2009 was designated as the International Year of Astronomy by the United Nations to coincide with the 400th anniversary of Galileo Galilei's first known astronomical studies with a telescope and the publication of Astronomia Nova by Johannes Kepler. It was also declared as the International Year of Natural Fibres by the United Nations General Assembly, as well as the International Year of Reconciliation and the Year of the Gorilla (UNEP and UNESCO).

The year also marked the deaths of many prominent entertainers including Michael Jackson, Farrah Fawcett, Brittany Murphy, Patrick Swayze, David Carradine and Ricardo Montalbán.

Events

January 
 January 1
 Japan, Mexico, Turkey and Uganda assume their seats on the United Nations Security Council.
 Asunción, the capital of Paraguay, becomes the American Capital of Culture and Vilnius and Linz become the European Capitals of Culture.
 Slovakia adopts the euro as its national currency, replacing the Slovak koruna.
 A Bay Area Rapid Transit police officer shoots and kills Oscar Grant, an unarmed black man, at Fruitvale station. The event becomes one of the inciting incidents for the global Black Lives Matter movement.
 January 3 – The first ("Genesis") block of the blockchain of the cryptocurrency and decentralized payment system Bitcoin is established by the creator of the system, known as Satoshi Nakamoto.
 January 15 – US Airways Flight 1549 ditches in the Hudson River in an accident that becomes known as the "Miracle on the Hudson", as all 155 people on board are rescued.
 January 18 – Gaza War: Hamas announces they will accept the Israel Defense Forces offer of a ceasefire, ending the conflict.
 January 20 – Barack Obama is sworn in as the 44th President of the United States, becoming the first African-American to hold the office.
 January 21 – Israel withdraws from the Gaza Strip, officially ending its three-week war with Hamas. However, intermittent air strikes by both sides continue in the following weeks.
 January 21 – Zhu Haiyang decapitates Yang Xin at Virginia Tech in the first campus murder since the Virginia Tech shooting.
 January 26
 The first trial at the International Criminal Court opens. Former Union of Congolese Patriots leader Thomas Lubanga Dyilo is accused of training child soldiers to kill, pillage and rape.
 The Icelandic government and banking system collapse. Prime Minister Geir Haarde immediately resigns.
 An annular solar eclipse takes place over the Indian Ocean, the 50th solar eclipse of Saros cycle 131.
January 28 – WikiLeaks releases 86 intercepted telephone recordings of politicians and businessmen involved in the 2008 Peru oil scandal.
January 31 – Tiféret Israel Synagogue attack, profanation of the oldest synagogue in Caracas, Venezuela.

February 
 February 1
 Patriarch Kirill of Moscow is enthroned as the Patriarch of the Russian Orthodox Church following the death of his predecessor, Alexy II in 2008.
 Jóhanna Sigurðardóttir is appointed as the new Prime Minister of Iceland, becoming the world's first openly lesbian head of government.
 February 7
 Bushfires in Victoria leave 173 dead in the worst natural disaster in Australia's history.
 February 13 – At 23:31:30 UTC, the decimal representation of Unix time reached 1234567890 seconds. Celebrations were held around the world, among various technical subcultures, to celebrate the 1234567890th second. 
 February 25 – Soldiers of Bangladeshi border security force Bangladesh Rifles (BDR) mutiny and take the commanding army officers and their families hostages at the force's headquarters in Pilkhana, Dhaka. 57 army officers are killed along with 17 civilians by the mutineers.
 February 26 – Former Serbian president Milan Milutinović is acquitted by the International Criminal Tribunal for the former Yugoslavia regarding war crimes during the Kosovo War.

March 
 March 2 – The President of Guinea-Bissau, João Bernardo Vieira, is assassinated during an armed attack on his residence in Bissau.
 March 4 – The International Criminal Court issues an arrest warrant for Sudanese President Omar al-Bashir for war crimes and crimes against humanity in Darfur. al-Bashir is the first sitting head of state to be indicted by the ICC since its establishment in 2002.
 March 7 – NASA's Kepler Mission, a space photometer that will search for extrasolar planets in the Milky Way galaxy, is launched from Cape Canaveral Air Force Station, Florida, USA.
 March 17 – The President of Madagascar, Marc Ravalomanana, is overthrown in a coup d'état, following a month of unrest in Antananarivo.

April 
 April 1 – Albania and Croatia are admitted to NATO, becoming the newest members of the organization.
 April 5 – North Korea launches a rocket from its Tonghae Satellite Launching Ground, which it says is carrying the Kwangmyŏngsŏng-2 satellite, prompting an emergency meeting of the United Nations Security Council.
 April 6 – A 6.3 magnitude earthquake strikes near L'Aquila, Italy, killing 308 and injuring more than 1,500.
 April 21 – UNESCO launches The World Digital Library.

May 
 May 11–24 – Space Shuttle Atlantis is launched to refurbish the Hubble Space Telescope on May 11, landing at Edwards Air Force Base May 24.
 May 12–16 – The Eurovision Song Contest 2009 takes place in Moscow, Russia, and is won by Norwegian entrant Alexander Rybak with the song "Fairytale".
 May 15 – France–Pakistan Atomic Energy Framework bilateral energy treaty is signed.
 May 17 – Minecraft gets its first update by Mojang Studios.
 May 18 – Following more than a quarter-century of fighting, the Sri Lankan Civil War ends with the total military defeat of the Liberation Tigers of Tamil Eelam.
 May 25 – North Korea announces that it has conducted a second successful nuclear test in North Hamgyong Province. The United Nations Security Council condemns the reported test.

June 

 June 1 – Air France Flight 447, en route from Rio de Janeiro, Brazil, to Paris, crashes into the Atlantic Ocean, killing all 228 on board.
 June 11 – The outbreak of the H1N1 influenza strain, commonly referred to as "swine flu", is deemed a global pandemic.
 June 12 – Analog television ends in the United States as part of the digital television transition.
 June 13 – Mass protests erupt across Iran following a disputed presidential election in which Mahmoud Ahmadinejad was reelected president, the largest demonstrations in the country since the Iranian Revolution.
 June 18 – NASA launches the Lunar Reconnaissance Orbiter / LCROSS probes to the Moon, the first American lunar mission since Lunar Prospector in 1998.
 June 21 – Greenland gains self-rule.
 June 25 – The death of American pop star Michael Jackson triggers an outpouring of worldwide grief. Online, reactions to the event cripple several major websites and services, as the abundance of people accessing the web addresses pushes internet traffic to unprecedented and historic levels.
 June 28 – The Military of Honduras ousts Honduran President Manuel Zelaya in a coup d'état, condemned by OAS.
 June 30 – Yemenia Flight 626 crashes off the coast of Moroni, Comoros, killing all but one of the 153 passengers and crew.

July 
 July 5 – Violent riots broke out in Ürümqi, Xinjiang. PRC officials said that a total of 197 people died.
 July 7 – A public memorial service for Michael Jackson is held at Staples Center. It is watched by over 2.5 billion people worldwide.
 July 15 – Caspian Airlines Flight 7908, en route from Tehran, Iran, to Yerevan, Armenia crashes into the Jannatabad village in Qazvin Province ; killing all 168 on board.
 July 16 – Iceland's national parliament, the Althingi, votes to pursue joining the EU.
 July 17 – Two bombs exploded separately at the JW Marriott and Ritz-Carlton Hotels in Jakarta, Indonesia, killing 9 people (including 2 suicide bombers) and injuring 53.
 July 22 – The longest total solar eclipse of the 21st century, lasting up to 6 minutes and 38.86 seconds (0.14 seconds shorter than 6 minutes and 39 seconds), occurs over parts of Asia and the Pacific Ocean.
 July 26 – The Islamic extremist group Boko Haram initiates an uprising in Bauchi State, Nigeria and quickly spreads throughout the northern part of the country.

August 
 August 3 – Bolivia becomes the first South American country to declare the right of indigenous people to govern themselves.
 August 7 – Typhoon Morakot hits Taiwan, killing 673 and stranding more than 1,000 via the worst flooding on the island in half a century.
 August 14 – The United Kingdom imposes direct rule on the Turks and Caicos Islands after an inquiry that found evidence of government corruption.

September 
 September 9 – StudioMini, a multitrack audio recording app is first released.
 September 21 – China becomes the first country to succeed a completed clinical trial by a company for the 2009/H1N1 vaccine in the world during the flu pandemic.
 September 22 – WikiLeaks exposes the contents of Kaupthing Bank's internal documents prior to the Icelandic Financial Crisis. These documents showed suspicious amounts of money were loaned to bank owners, and debts being written off.
 September 23 – Korba chimney collapse: At least 45 workers are killed when lightning strikes a chimney under construction in Korba, Chhattisgarh, India, causing it to collapse.
 September 26 –Typhoon Ketsana, PAGASA Name: Ondoy, makes landfall in The Philippines, killing hundreds in Metro Manila and flooding in Huế, Vietnam.
 September 28 - At least 157 demonstrators are massacred by the Guinean military at the Stade du 28 Septembre during a protest against the government that came to power in a coup d'état the previous year.
 September 29 – A 8.1  earthquake strikes Samoa, with a maximum Mercalli intensity of VII (Very strong), leaving at least 192 people dead.
 September 30 – A 7.6  earthquake strikes Sumatra, Indonesia, with a maximum Mercalli intensity of VIII (Severe), leaving at least 1,115 people dead.

October 
 October 1 – Paleontologists announce the discovery of an Ardipithecus ramidus fossil skeleton, deeming it the oldest remains of a human ancestor yet found.
 October 2
 Ireland holds a second referendum on the EU's Lisbon Treaty. The amendment is approved by the Irish electorate, having been rejected in the Lisbon I referendum held last year.
 The International Olympic Committee awards Rio de Janeiro the right to host the 2016 Summer Olympics.
October 15 – It is revealed the company Trafigura has been using a super-injunction to stop The Guardian from reporting about the 2006 Côte d'Ivoire toxic dumping incident, which Trafigura was responsible for.
October 20
Susilo Bambang Yudhoyono is inaugurated for a second term as President of Indonesia.
WikiLeaks leaked the membership listing of a radical political group known as the British National Party.
 October 22 – Microsoft releases Windows 7.
 October 23 – The 2009 Cataño oil refinery fire began after an explosion at the refinery in Bayamón, Puerto Rico.
 October 25 – Two suicide attacks in Baghdad, Iraq, kill 155 people and injure at least 721 people.
 October 27 - Riot Games releases MOBA video game League of Legends

November 
 November 3
 The Czech Republic becomes the final member-state of the European Union to sign the Treaty of Lisbon, thereby permitting that document's initiation into European law.
 The Prime Minister of Belgium, Herman Van Rompuy, is designated the first permanent President of the European Council, a position he takes up on December 1, 2009.
 November 10 – Call of Duty: Modern Warfare 2 was released.
November 13 – Having analyzed the data from the LCROSS lunar impact, NASA announces that it has found a "significant" quantity of water in the Moon's Cabeus crater.
 November 23 – In the Philippines, at least 58 people are abducted and killed in the province of Maguindanao, in what the Committee to Protect Journalists called the single deadliest attack on journalists in history.
 November 24 – The Avdhela Project, an Aromanian digital library and cultural initiative, is founded in Bucharest, Romania.

December 
 December 1 – The Treaty of Lisbon comes into force.
 December 5 – Fire at the Lame Horse nightclub in Perm, Russia.
 December 7–18 – The UNFCCC's 2009 United Nations Climate Change Conference is held in Copenhagen, Denmark.
 December 8 – A series of attacks in Baghdad, Iraq kill at least 127 people and injure at least 448 more.
 December 16 – Astronomers discover GJ 1214 b, the first-known exoplanet on which water could exist.
 December 15 – First flight of the Boeing 787 Dreamliner.
 December 25 – A Nigerian terrorist plotted an attempted terrorist bombing of Northwest Airlines Flight 253 en route from Amsterdam to Detroit.

Births and Deaths

Nobel Prizes 

 Chemistry – Ada Yonath, Venkatraman Ramakrishnan, and Thomas A. Steitz
 Economics – Elinor Ostrom and Oliver E. Williamson
 Literature – Herta Müller
 Peace – Barack Obama
 Physics – Charles K. Kao, Willard Boyle, and George E. Smith
 Physiology or Medicine – Elizabeth Blackburn, Carol W. Greider, and Jack W. Szostak

New English words 
alt-right
copernicium
subtweet

References